Kristoff Bjorgman is a fictional character in Walt Disney Animation Studios' Frozen franchise. He appeared in the animated features Frozen (2013) and Frozen II (2019), and the animated short films Frozen Fever (2015) and Olaf's Frozen Adventure (2017). He is voiced primarily by Jonathan Groff.

Kristoff is a Sámi iceman who lives together with his reindeer companion Sven. Albeit preferring a solitary life, he helps Princess Anna of Arendelle to find her older sister Elsa in the North Mountain.

Development

Origins and conception
In the early development, Kristoff was originally Kai as in Hans Christian Andersen's "The Snow Queen", but later he was designed as combination of Kai and the robber girl.

Voice
He is primarily voiced by Jonathan Groff, while he's voiced as a child by Tyree Brown.

Physical appearance
Kristoff is tall, rugged, handsome, and in his early twenties. His build is a distinct variation on most Disney heroes. He has broad shoulders, large hands and feet, and a muscular build. He is significantly larger than Princess Anna. His build is a realistic consequence of his rough life as a mountain-dwelling ice harvester.

Appearance

Frozen

Kristoff is the first major character to appear in the movie, appearing in "Frozen Heart" as an eight-year-old orphan boy with his baby reindeer, Sven, who becomes his best friend. He attempts to mimic the elder ice harvesters with mixed success. Later that night, Sven is pulling him through the woods when the two horses belonging to the royal family of Arendelle ride past him at speed while transporting Anna to the trolls. Kristoff becomes intrigued as one of them is leaving behind a trail of ice (as that horse is carrying a distraught Elsa). From a distance, Kristoff watches as Pabbie, leader of the trolls, heals Anna's head. Meanwhile, one of the female trolls, Bulda, adopts Kristoff as her own child.

Thirteen years later, Kristoff is a seasoned ice harvester by trade who lives in the mountains near Arendelle. Prior to the coronation he is briefly seen in Arendelle selling ice and sharing a carrot with Sven. He next appears at Wandering Oaken's Trading Post & Sauna, arriving at the same time as Anna covered in snow and seeking to purchase carrots for Sven and rope for climbing. From Kristoff's exchange with Oaken, Anna learns that the blizzard in Arendelle comes from the North Mountain and assumes that is where Elsa is hiding. However, Kristoff is thrown out of the store for calling Oaken a crook. Seeing that Kristoff has a sled, Anna buys all of his items and urges him to take her to the North Mountain. Kristoff is reluctant to help her at first but eventually gives in.

As Anna and Kristoff head for the North Mountain, Kristoff is incredulous learning about her whirlwind engagement to Hans. The conversation is cut short when their sled is attacked by hungry wolves. The group escape, though at the cost of Kristoff's sled, to his dismay. He decides to continue helping Anna despite this setback, and the next day they meet Olaf, an anthropomorphic snowman unknowingly created by Elsa, who leads them the rest of the way to Elsa's ice castle. Kristoff waits outside while Anna tries to persuade Elsa to go back to Arendelle, believing Elsa can put an end to the winter. When Anna fails to persuade Elsa and accidentally gets hit in the heart, Kristoff knows whose help to seek and takes Anna to the trolls. The trolls initially assume Kristoff is introducing Anna to his family as his bride-to-be, but Kristoff corrects them and asks to speak to Pabbie. Regarding the ice in Anna's heart, Pabbie says only "an act of true love" can save her. Thinking a "true love's kiss" from Hans is needed, Kristoff takes Anna back to Arendelle and sadly hands her over to the care of the castle staff at the gate.

On the way back into the mountains, Sven attempts to push Kristoff back to Arendelle but he refuses, thinking it is selfish to pursue his love instead of letting Anna be saved by Hans. However, a giant snowstorm appears over Arendelle, prompting him to return out of concern for Anna's safety. There he eventually finds Anna, but Anna chooses to save Elsa from Hans instead of running to Kristoff. Kristoff has to watch Anna freeze solid, though moments later he is overjoyed as Anna's self-sacrifice counted as "an act of true love" and caused her to unfreeze. In the end, he is named Royal Ice Master and Deliverer and receives a new sled from Anna as promised, and the two share a kiss.

Frozen Fever

In the short film Frozen Fever, Kristoff helps Elsa plan a surprise birthday party for Anna. While taking Anna on a birthday treasure hunt throughout the kingdom, Elsa comes down with a cold and unknowingly creates little snowmen called "snowgies" with each sneeze, which create trouble for Kristoff, Sven, and Olaf. Kristoff and Olaf later take the snowgies up to Elsa's ice palace to live with Marshmallow.

Olaf's Frozen Adventure

Kristoff appeared in a 21-minute holiday film along with Anna, Elsa, Olaf, and Sven, which debuted in theaters for a limited time engagement with Disney·Pixar's Coco on November 22, 2017. It made its television debut on ABC on December 14, 2017. Like the rest of Arendelle (save for the royal family), it is revealed that Kristoff has his own holiday tradition, this being an annual celebration honoring Flemmingrad, a jolly fungus troll that was tragically killed by humans.

Frozen II

In the 2019 movie, Kristoff plans to propose to Anna, but his attempts to find the right moment repeatedly fail. He and Sven accidentally become separated from Anna, Elsa, and Olaf, and he forlornly wonders whether he and Anna are growing apart. During the final battle he hears Anna agitating the jötunn and comes to her assistance. After the dam is destroyed, Kristoff, Anna, and Sven are reunited with Elsa and learn that Arendelle was saved from the torrent. After Olaf is brought back to life, Kristoff finally asks Anna to marry him, calling her the most extraordinary person he has ever known. Anna happily accepts.

Disney theme parks
From July 5 to September 1, 2014, as part of 'Frozen' Summer Fun show at Disney's Hollywood Studios, Anna and Elsa appeared in a horse-drawn sleigh making their way down Hollywood Boulevard, alongside Kristoff and skaters, skiers and ice cutters in the Anna and Elsa's Royal Welcome section. The sisters will also make appearances in For the First Time in Forever: A Frozen Sing-Along Celebration, where they are joined by royal historians to retell the history of Arendelle; and "Frozen" Fireworks Spectacular alongside Kristoff and Olaf, a fireworks display set to the music of Frozen. Officially starting January 7, 2014, Kristoff began making appearances alongside Anna and Elsa at Disney California Adventure in "For the First Time in Forever – A Frozen Sing-Along Celebration" in Hollywood Land as part of the park's "Frozen Fun" event.

Stage

In the stage adaptation of Frozen, Jelani Alladin originated the role of Kristoff on Broadway at the St. James Theatre in 2018. Obioma Ugoala played Kristoff in the 2021 West End run at the Theatre Royal, Drury Lane.

Reception

Collider writer Matt Goldberg commented that Kristoff was "slightly less interesting than his love-interest (Anna)", but the cuteness of Anna and Kristoff’s relationship compensates the defect.

References

External links
Official character page

Disney's Frozen characters
Fictional Sámi people
Film characters introduced in 2013
Male characters in animated films
Male characters in film
Orphan characters in film
Animated characters introduced in 2013